Arun Mitra (2 November 1909 – 22 August 2000) was an Indian poet of Bengali, who also translated French literature.

Selected bibliography 

English translations of titles are literal in most instances. Transcription of Bengali titles try to represent, as much as possible, the Bengali vernacular and not Sanskrit pronunciation of words.

Poetry

 Prantorekha [Horizon Line] Arani Publication, Kolkata. 1943
 Utser Dikey [Toward the Source] Dipankar Publication, Kolkata. 1955
 Ghonishto Taap [Intimate Warmth] Tribeni Publishers, Kolkata. 1963
 Mancher Bairey Matitey [Beyond the Stage on the Earth] Saraswat Publication, Kolkata. 1970
 Shudhu Raater Shabdo Noi [Not Just the Rustle of the Night] Nabopatro Publication, Kolkata. 1978 (Winner, Rabindranath Tagore Award)
 Prathom Poli Shesh Pathor [First Silt Last Stone] Karuna Publication, Kolkata. 1981
 Khunjtey Khunjtey Eto Door [So Far After Searching So Long] Pratikhshan Publication, Kolkata. 1986 (Winner, Sahitya Akademi Award)
 Jodio Agun Jhor Dhasha Danga [Although a Bank Ravaged by Firestorm] Pratikhshan Publication, Kolkata. 1988
 Ei Amrito Ei Garol [This Nectar This Venom] Proma Publication, Kolkata. 1991
 Tunikathaar Gherao Thekey Bolchhi [I Speak Surrounded by Small Talk] Anushtup Publication, Kolkata. 1992
 Khara Urboray Chinho Diye Choli [I Put My Signature on Drought and on Plenty] Pratikhshan Publication, Kolkata. 1994
 Andhokaar Jatokkhon Jegey Thakey [As Long As Darkness Remains Awake] Ananda Publishers, Kolkata. 1996
 Ora Uritey Noi [Not in Random Flight] Kobita Pakhshik, Kolkata. 1997
 Bhangoner Mati [Eroding Soil] Dey's Publishing House, Kolkata. 1998
 Uchchhanno Shomayer Shukh Dukkho Ghirey [Surrounded By Joy and Sorrow of a Wayward Time] Ananda Publishers, Kolkata. 1999

Anthology
 Arun Mitrer Sreshtho Kobita [Best Poems of Arun Mitra] Bharobi Publication, Kolkata. 1972
 Arun Mitrer Sreshtho Kobita [Best poems of Arun Mitra] Narbaak Publication, Kolkata. 1985
 Kabya Shamagro, Vol. I [Collected Poems] Protibhas Publication, Kolkata. 1988
 Kabya Shamagro, Vol. II [Collected Poems] Protibhas Publication, Kolkata. 1992
 Bulaar Raagmala [Bula's Garland of Raags] Proma Publication, Kolkata. 1994
 Nirbachito Premer Kobita [Selected Poems About Love] Bikash Gronthaboli, Kolkata. 1994
 Panchsho Bachhorer Pharashi Kobita [Five Hundred Years of French Poetry] Translation of various French poets Proma Publication, Kolkata. 1994
 Shwanirbachito Sreshtho Kobita [Best Poems—selected by the poet] Abhijat Publication, Kolkata. 1999
 Arun Mitrer Sreshtho Kobita [Best poems of Arun Mitra] Dey's Publishing House, Kolkata. 1999
 Arun Mitrer Anubad Sangraha, Vol I [Collected Translations of Arun Mitra: Candide; Sartre o Tnar Sesh Sanglap; Aragon] Ed. Chinmoy Guha, Gangchil, Kolkata. 2012 .
 Arun Mitrer Prabandha Sangraha, Vol I [Collected Essays of Arun Mitra: Kabir Katha, Kabider Katha; Srijan Sahitya Nanan Bhavna; Farasi Sahitya Prasange] Ed. Chinmoy Guha, Gangchil, Kolkata. 2012. .

Narratives
 Shikawr Jodi Chena Jai [If Roots Are Known] Bengali novel, Karuna Publication, Kolkata. 1979
 Candide, Ba Ashabad [Candide, or Optimism] Translation of Voltaire, Sahitya Akademi, New Delhi. 1970, 3rd Edition 2001

Collections (prose)
 Pharashi Shahitto Proshongey [On French literature] Critical essays Proma Publication, Kolkata. 1985
 Srijan Shahitto Nanaan Bhabna [Creative Literature Various Thoughts] Protibhas Publication, Kolkata. 1987
 Aragon [Aragon] On Louis Aragon: Critical/Biographical Proma Publication, Kolkata. 1991
 Khola Chokhey [With Eyes Open] Proma Publication, Kolkata. 1992
 Pather Morey [At the Crossroads] Remembering writers, artists, friends Proma Publication, Kolkata. 1996
 Kobir Katha, Kobider Katha [About Poet and Poets] Essays on poetry and individual poets Kobita Prakhshik, Kolkata. 1997
 Kobita Ami O Amra [Poetry Myself and We] Essays on Bengali and French literature Dey's Publishing House, Kolkata. 1999
 Jibaner Rangey [In the Color of Life] Memoirs Abhijit Publication, Kolkata. 1999

Seclected works on Arun Mitra
 Kobi Arun Mitra [The Poet Arun Mitra] Collection of critical essays, analyses, commentaries edited by Shankha Ghosh and Arun Sen Parichay/Anushtup, Kolkata. 1986
 Arun Mitra (in English) by Abanti Sanyal "Makers of Indian Literature" series Sahitya Akademi, New Delhi. 2003

External links
 arunmitra.org: Website launched on centenary of Arun Mitra
 Some writings of Arun Mitra
 Nirmal Kanti Bhattacharjee: An Overview - MUSE India

20th-century Bengali poets
Bengali-language writers
Bengali male poets
Bengali poets
Recipients of the Rabindra Puraskar
People from Jessore District
City College, Kolkata alumni
University of Calcutta alumni
University of Paris alumni
1909 births
2000 deaths
Bengali Hindus
20th-century Bengalis
Recipients of the Sahitya Akademi Award in Bengali
Indian male writers
Indian poets
Indian male poets
Indian translators
Indian essayists
Indian male essayists
Indian novelists
Indian male novelists
Indian short story writers
Indian male short story writers
Indian journalists
Indian male journalists
Indian newspaper journalists
20th-century Indian writers
20th-century Indian male writers
20th-century Indian poets
20th-century Indian translators
20th-century Indian essayists
20th-century Indian short story writers
20th-century Indian novelists
20th-century Indian journalists
Writers from Kolkata
Poets from West Bengal